EDKO (Beijing) Distribution is a Chinese and Hong Kong film production company and distributor.

Filmography

References

Film distributors of China
Film production companies of China
Film production companies of Hong Kong
International sales agents